Metarctia haematricha is a moth of the subfamily Arctiinae. It was described by George Hampson in 1905. It is found in Eritrea, Ethiopia and Kenya.

References

 

Metarctia
Moths described in 1905